Mape may refer to:

Things
 Mape, a toe loop jump in figure skating, after Bruce Mapes
 Mape, a novel by André Maurois
 MAPE, the Minnesota Association of Professional Employees.

Places
 Mape, Zumalai Subdistrict, a town in Cova Lima District, East Timor
 Lake Mape a lake and national park in Sierra Leone

Statistics
 MAPE, mean absolute percentage error

Computing
 Monitor, Analyse, Plan, Execute, an architectural building block in autonomic computing

See also
 Mapes (disambiguation)